The 2019 OFC Champions League knockout stage was played from 6 April to 12 May 2019. A total of eight teams competed in the knockout stage to decide the champions of the 2019 OFC Champions League.

Qualified teams
The winners and runners-up of each of the four groups in the group stage advanced to the quarter-finals.

Format
The eight teams in the knockout stage played on a single-elimination basis, with each tie played as a single match.

Schedule
The schedule of each round was as follows.

Bracket
The bracket was determined as follows:

The bracket was decided after the draw for the knockout stage (quarter-finals, semi-finals, and final), which was held on 5 March 2019 at the OFC Headquarters in Auckland, New Zealand.

Quarter-finals
In the quarter-finals, the winners of one group played the runners-up of another group (teams from same group could not play each other), with the group winners hosting the match, and the matchups decided by draw. The quarter-finals were played between 6–7 April 2019.

Semi-finals
In the semi-finals, the four quarter-final winners played in two ties, with the matchups and host teams decided by draw. The semi-finals were played on 28 April 2019.

Final
In the final, the two semi-final winners played each other, with the host team decided by draw. The final was played on 11 May 2019.

References

External links
OFC Champions League 2019, oceaniafootball.com

3
April 2019 sports events in Oceania
May 2019 sports events in Oceania